The 2021–22 season was Manchester United Women's fourth season since they were founded and their third in the FA Women's Super League, the professional top-flight women's league in England. The club also competed in the FA Cup and League Cup.

Following the resignation of Casey Stoney at the end of the previous season, Marc Skinner was announced as the new Manchester United head coach on 29 July 2021, having stood down from his head coaching position at Orlando Pride in order to take the job.

Having played at Old Trafford behind closed doors during the previous season due to the COVID-19 pandemic, the team played at Old Trafford in front of fans for the first time on 27 March 2022. They beat Everton 3–1 with a new club record 20,241 in attendance.

Pre-season 
Manchester United scheduled four preseason friendlies, with all but the Rangers game played behind closed doors. The matches against Championship side Liverpool and WSL side Aston Villa were both played at Carrington with the former broadcast live on MUTV. A week-long training camp in Scotland included a friendly against Rangers of the SWPL before a final friendly against WSL side Brighton & Hove Albion held on neutral ground at Loughborough University.

FA Women's Super League

Matches

Table

Women's FA Cup 

As a member of the first tier, United entered the FA Cup in the fourth round proper. They were drawn away to third-division Bridgwater United, winning 2–0 in front of a sellout club-record crowd of 2,500. For the fifth round proper, United were drawn against Manchester City for the fifth time in the last six cup competitions. United had most recently beaten City in their last cup meeting, 2–1 in this season's League Cup.

FA Women's League Cup

Group stage 
As a team not qualified for the group stage of the Champions League, Manchester United entered the League Cup at the group stage. They were drawn into Group B, one of two Northern section groups, alongside fellow WSL clubs Everton and Leicester City, and Championship side Durham. Because Manchester City were knocked out of the Champions League during the qualifying rounds, they belatedly entered the League Cup group stage after the draw was made instead of receiving a bye and were placed alongside United in Group B as the only remaining Northern group with four teams.

Group B

Ranking of second-placed teams

Knockout phase 
The draw for the quarter-final was made on 20 December 2021 with Manchester United drawn away to five-time winners Arsenal, the competition's most successful team. The teams had met once before in the League Cup when United were a Championship side in the 2018–19 season.

Squad statistics 

Numbers in brackets denote appearances as substitute.
Key to positions: GK – Goalkeeper; DF – Defender; MF – Midfielder; FW – Forward

Transfers

In

Out

Loans in

Loans out

Notes

References

External links 
  

2021-22
Manchester United